Chilean Jews are Chileans residing in the Republic of Chile who are of either Jewish ancestry or observe the Jewish faith.

In the 2012 Chilean census, 16,294 Chilean residents listed their religion as Judaism, an increase of 8.8% since 2002. The actual Jewish community in Chile is estimated to be slightly larger. Chilean Jews are found across the country, although the majority live in the cities of Santiago and Valparaíso, and are predominantly found in higher-paying professions and all walks of public life. The Chilean Jewish population decreased in the political turmoil of the 1970s and 1980s, but their identity as Jews in Chile remains. Most Chilean Jews are Ashkenazim. Here is a list of some prominent Chilean Jews.

Actors

 Shlomit Baytelman, actress
 Alejandro Cohen, actor
 Daniel Emilfork, actor
 Anita Klesky, actress
 Ariel Levy, actor
 Nissim Sharim, actor
 Paula Sharim, actress
 Jael Unger, actress

Sportspeople

 Rodrigo Goldberg (born 1971), football, forward (national team)
 Kai Horwitz (born 1998), Olympic alpine skier
 Nicolás Massú (born 1979), tennis player, highest world ranking # 9, 2x Olympic champion (singles & doubles)
 Sebastian Rozental (born 1976), football, forward (national team)

Scientists
 Mordo Alvo, physician and member of the scientific academy Instituto de Chile
 Claudio Bunster, scientist (Jewish mother)
 Fernando Cassorla, physician and member of the scientific academy Instituto de Chile
 Alejandro Lipschuetz, anthropologist and endocrinologist

Mathematicians
 Robert Frucht
 Leo Corry

Other notable Chileans of Jewish descent
Andrés Weintraub, Professor Department of Industrial Engineering University of Chile
Chris Isaak Apablaza, zoologist
Leonardo Farkas, businessman and philanthropist 
 Marjorie Agosín, human rights activist, professor, and writer
 Shai Agosin, TV producer and presenter
 José Berdichewsky, Pinochet's Ambassador in Israel
 Eduardo Bitrán, former Minister of Public Works
 David Stitchkin Branover, Rector of the University of Concepción from 1956 - 1962.
 Roberto Brodsky, novelist and screenwriter 
 Cristopher Carpentier, chef (converted to Judaism)
 Jacques Chonchol, Minister of Agriculture in the Allende government
Leopoldo Donnebaum, businessman and philanthropist
 Ariel Dorfman, author and scholar
 Roberto Dueñas, modeling agent
 Christián Apablaza, Photographer, Graphic artist 
 Julián Elfenbein, journalist, television host
 Efrain Friedman, director of Chilean Atomic Research Committee
 Benjamín Galemiri, playwright
 Rodrigo Guendelman, journalist
 Clarisa Hardy, psychologist; former (2006-2007) Minister of Planning
 Rodrigo Hinzpeter, politician
 Tomás Hirsch, politician, businessman
 Jeremías Israel, motoracing driver (Jewish father)
 Mauricio Israel, television host
 Claudio Jodorkovsky, rabbi
 Alejandro Jodorowsky, film director (Chilean-born)
 Alberto van Klaveren, (2006–2009) Deputy Minister of Foreign Relations
 José Klein, former owner of Minera Santa Barbara
 Marcelo Kormis, rabbi
 Mario Kreutzberger, better known as Don Francisco, TV host
 Vivi Kreutzberger, television host
 Marcos Libedinsky, former president of the Supreme Court of Justice
 Sergio Melnick, economist, Minister of ODEPLAN under Pinochet
 Lily Pérez, politician
 Daniel Platovsky, businessman, politician, and eldest son of Milan Platovsky (Jewish father)
 Milan Platovsky, Holocaust survivor and businessman who wrote a best-selling autobiography
 Andres Pollak, jazz musician
 Karen Poniachik, journalist; former Minister of Mining and Energy
 Sarika Rodrik, fashion designer
 Frank Sauerbaum, politician
 Daniel Schidlow, Dean, Drexel University College of Medicine, Drexel University, Philadelphia, PA, U.S.A. (Chilean born)
 Leon Schidlowsky, music teacher and composer
 Miguel Schweitzer Speisky, Pinochet's Minister of Justice
 Miguel Schweitzer Walters, Pinochet's Minister of External Affairs and ambassador to the UK
 Jorge Schaulsohn, politician
 Gabriel Silber, deputy
 Jacob Stoulman Bortnik, businessman, kidnapped by DINA during the Operacion Condor plan in Argentina
 Víctor Tevah, fiddler
 Marcelo Tokman, Minister of Energy
 Julián Vainstein, rabbi
 Ana Vásquez-Bronfman (née Ana Lucia Bronfman Weinstein), (1931-2009) writer, social scientist
 José Weinstein, Minister of Culture under Ricardo Lagos
 Luis Weinstein, photographer
 Jaime Wisnaik, director of department of engineering at the Catholic University of Santiago
 Mario Alvo, businessmen
 Volodia Teitelboim Volosky, politician,lawyer and general secretary of the communist party of chile

See also

History of the Jews in Chile
Benei Sión
List of Latin American Jews
List of Chileans
List of Jews

References

External links
Jews celebrate 100 years in Chile (El Mercurio)

 
Chile
Jews,Chile